Mind Games is the fourth studio album by English musician John Lennon. It was recorded at Record Plant Studios in New York in summer 1973. The album was released in the US on 29 October 1973 and in the UK on 16 November 1973. It was Lennon's first self-produced recording without help from Phil Spector. Like his previous album, the politically topical and somewhat abrasive Some Time in New York City, Mind Games received mixed reviews upon release. It reached number 13 in the UK and number 9 in the US, where it was certified gold.

The album was recorded while Lennon was having difficulties with US immigration and at the beginning of his 18-month separation from Yoko Ono. The title track was released as a single at the same time as the album. The album itself was later reissued several times throughout the 1970s and 1980s.

Background
By the start of 1973, John Lennon began distancing himself from the political and social issues he had embraced in the previous 18 months. It was also around this time that he and his wife, Yoko Ono, were going through marital problems. As Ono was completing her fourth album, Feeling the Space, Lennon decided he also wanted to record a new album, and liked the studio musicians that their assistant and production coordinator May Pang had assembled for Ono's album. Shortly thereafter, he asked Pang to book them for his sessions. Wanting to produce an album that would be more accepted than his previous politically charged commercial flop Some Time in New York City, Lennon began writing and demoing a few songs for Mind Games in his Greenwich Village apartment. He began composing after a period of almost a year of not writing any material.

Amid frequent court appearances battling to stay in the United States, Lennon became stressed, a situation that was only worsened by constant surveillance by the FBI, due to his political activism. Lennon said, "I just couldn't function, you know? I was so paranoid from them tappin' the phone and followin' me." All this combined made Lennon begin to feel emotionally withdrawn. Lennon put his suffering aside to write the songs for Mind Games, writing all the songs for it in a week.

Under the moniker of "The Plastic U.F.Ono Band", Lennon engaged the services of session drummer Jim Keltner, guitarist David Spinozza, Gordon Edwards on bass, Arthur Jenkins on percussion, Michael Brecker on saxophone, Ken Ascher on piano and organ, and the vocal backing of a group called Something Different. Difficulties between Lennon and Ono became more and more noticeable around this time. Just as the sessions were to get under way in June at New York's Record Plant Studios, John and Yoko separated. At Ono's urging, Pang became Lennon's companion and lover in what would become an 18-month relationship later renowned as Lennon's "lost weekend".

Recording and content
Mind Games was recorded between July and August 1973 in Lennon's characteristic quick fashion, and was mixed over a two-week period. Lennon produced the album by himself, following his previous three-year partnership with Phil Spector. When the album was remixed in 2002, many audio anomalies hidden in the original mixing were uncovered. Some rough mixes appear on bootlegs and on 1997's John Lennon Anthology.

The album continued Lennon's previous attempts to chronicle his life through his songs, the tone of which displays a range of mixed feelings. Among the sombre and melodic songs directed to Ono, "Aisumasen (I'm Sorry)" was originally titled "Call My Name", a song in which Lennon was offering to comfort someone, whereas the final version sees him asking for forgiveness. In "One Day (At a Time)", Lennon sings about his devotion to Ono. "Out the Blue" also reflects Lennon's devotion to his wife, and reflects its author's self-doubt as a result of their separation. "Out the Blue" incorporates several musical genres, starting with a gentle, melancholy acoustic guitar and moving through gospel, country and choral music portions. Another love song, "You Are Here" took its title from Lennon's one-off art exhibition at the Robert Fraser Gallery. By the time of the Mind Games sessions, the composition had gone through several different themes, before Lennon settled on the theme of love and peace. The original master take of "You Are Here" featured an extra verse, that was about Japan and England.

Other songs on the album are more light-hearted and optimistic, marking the return of Lennon's humour and wit after the uncompromising doctrine espoused on Some Time in New York City. These tracks include "Intuition", in which Lennon relates how life experience has honed his instincts and how it's good to have gotten through it. While demoing the song on piano in early 1973, with the lyrics still incomplete, he added a few lines from two previously released tracks – "How?", from Imagine (1971), and "God", from John Lennon/Plastic Ono Band (1970). "Only People" reflects his and Ono's personal philosophy. Lennon later said that it failed as a song, however; in an interview with Playboy, he remarked: "It was a good lick, but I couldn't get the words to make sense."

Also appearing on Mind Games are songs that indulged Lennon's affinity for pure rock 'n' roll, such as "Tight A$", the title of which was a pun on the expressions "tight as" and "tight ass". The track is in the rockabilly style with a 1950s sound, along the lines of songs that inspired Lennon in his youth. Another rock track, "Meat City" contains lyrics more in keeping with Lennon's earlier penchant for obscure imagery over the personal. The song was a boogie piece until late in 1971, when it began to take its final form, although with improvised lyrics. By late 1972, Lennon had rewritten the words and finished developing the melody.

The song "Mind Games", with its "love is the answer" refrain and call to "make love not war", recalls Lennon's work with the Beatles in 1967. He started writing the track during the band's Get Back sessions, in early 1969, with the title "Make Love, Not War". Lennon finished it after reading the book Mind Games: The Guide to Inner Space. Lennon had recorded demos of the retitled "Mind Games" on 28 and 29 December 1970, at his home studio, Ascot Sound Studios.

"Bring on the Lucie (Freda Peeple)" dated from late 1971, having started out as little more than a chorus, after Lennon acquired a National guitar. Once he had worked on the lyrics, the song went from a simple political slogan to a full-blown statement that hints at his earlier work, such as "Imagine" and "Power to the People". "Only People" and the three-second silent "Nutopian International Anthem" were the only political tracks on the album. The latter referred to "Nutopia: The Country of Peace", a conceptual country which the Lennons had announced at a press conference in New York City on April Fool's Day 1973. "I Know (I Know)" features lyrics in which Lennon apologises for his thoughtlessness and discusses the causes of his insecurity. On some of the rough mixes available on bootlegs, the time-consuming overdubbing on the song is apparent, as Lennon gradually refined the arrangement. The final track on Mind Games, "Meat City" contains a Lennon curse, "Fuck a pig!", sped up and backwards, while the mix used as the B-side to the "Mind Games" single gave the same treatment to the phrase "Check the album!"

"Rock and Roll People" was also recorded during the album's sessions and given to Johnny Winter for his John Dawson Winter III album.  Lennon's version remained unreleased until 1986's posthumous Menlove Ave. album.

Release and promotion
Tony King, vice-president of Apple Records in Los Angeles at the time, convinced Lennon to promote Mind Games, arranging interviews for Lennon with Billboard and Record World. He also persuaded Lennon to do a television commercial in which King dressed up as the Queen of the United Kingdom and waltzed with Lennon (the commercial session can be seen in the 1988 film Imagine: John Lennon). King reprised his role as the Queen for two radio spots promoting the album.

Lennon created the Mind Games album cover himself, hand-cutting the photos. The front and back covers are similar; on the back sleeve Lennon is more toward the foreground, representing his symbolic walking away from Ono and her apparent mountainous influence on him.

Mind Games was released on 29 October in America and 16 November in Britain, around the same time as Ono's Feeling the Space. Apple Records issued the title track as a single, with the release dates matching those of the album in the US and UK. The single reached number 26 in the UK, and peaked at number 18 on the Billboard Hot 100 in the US. The album charted at number 13 in the UK and peaked at number 9 on Billboards Top LP's listings. Although Mind Games sold better than Some Time in New York City, its release "came and went with barely a ripple", according to Beatles biographer Chris Ingham. Author Peter Doggett similarly writes that the album "did nothing to alter [Lennon's] status as the least commercially successful Beatle".

Critical reception

Jon Landau of Rolling Stone magazine assessed the songs on Mind Games as "his worst writing yet" and considered that Lennon was "helplessly trying to impose his own gargantuan ego upon an audience ... [that] is waiting hopefully for him to chart a new course". While finding the music "listenable", Landau identified the album's lyrics as "misguided in so underrating his audience's intelligence" and added: "But then, perhaps Lennon's didacticism, preaching and banality are part of the mind game of the album's title..." More impressed, Melody Makers Ray Coleman found that "The raw nerves of a Lennon battered by America's curious logic and sheer hard-heartedness seem to have spurred him to write incisively..." Coleman concluded of Mind Games: "Musically or melodically this may not be a stand-out album, but if you warm to the rasping voice of Lennon and, like me, regard him as the true fulcrum of much of what came from his old group, then like any new Lennon album, it will be enjoyable and even important." In Creem magazine, Robert Christgau described the album as "a step in the right direction... but only a step. It sounds like out-takes from Imagine, which may not seem so bad but means that Lennon is falling back on ideas (intellectual and musical) that have lost their freshness for him: Still, the single works, and let's hope he keeps right on stepping."

Writing in their 1975 book The Beatles: An Illustrated Record, NME journalists Roy Carr and Tony Tyler opined that Mind Games "bears all the hallmarks of being made without any definite objective in mind – other than to redeem the unpleasantness of Some Time In New York City". While noting the singer's attempts to re-create "the lyricism and melodic inventiveness" of Imagine, Carr and Tyler continued: "The reason the total album is not more effective can be laid at the door of Lennon's personal situation, and on his tendency to react to events, instead of initiating them." In The Beatles Apart (1981), Bob Woffinden considered that, aside from the "excellent" title track and "Bring on the Lucie", Mind Games "consisted of so-so songs that hardly lodged in the memory", and that "The best one can say of the album is that it's exceptionally well produced."

In a more recent review, for AllMusic, critic Stephen Thomas Erlewine writes that "confusion... lies at the heart of the album. Lennon doesn't know which way to go, so he tries everything." Erlewine adds: "While the best numbers are among Lennon's finest, there's only a handful of them, and the remainder of the record is simply pleasant."

Lennon himself later said: "The Mind Games single is fine, but there's just no energy to sustain through the album and there's no clarity of vision. That cover says more than the record to me."

Reissues
The album was reissued in the US on Capitol Records in 1978 and 1980, with the latter being a budget reissue. In the UK, the album was reissued on EMI's budget label, Music for Pleasure (MFP), on 28 November 1980, featuring a different album cover. After Lennon's death in December 1980, the album, along with seven other Lennon albums, was reissued by EMI as part of a box set, which was released in the UK on 15 June 1981. It was first issued on CD on 3 August 1987, this time on the Parlophone label, and several months later on 22 March 1988 in the US on the Capitol label.

In 2002, a remixing of Mind Games for its remastered reissue, containing three previously unreleased demo recordings, was overseen by Allan Rouse, which was released on 21 October 2002 in the UK, and almost a month later in the US, on 5 November 2002. It was reissued again by Mobile Fidelity Sound Lab in 2004 on CD and LP. In 2010, the original mix was remastered as part of the re-release of Lennon's entire catalogue, the album was available separately or as part of the John Lennon Signature Box.

Track listing 
All songs written by John Lennon.

Original release 
Side one
"Mind Games" – 4:13
"Tight A$" – 3:37
"Aisumasen (I'm Sorry)" – 4:44
"One Day (At a Time)" – 3:09
"Bring on the Lucie (Freda Peeple)" – 4:12
"Nutopian International Anthem" – 0:03

Side two
"Intuition" – 3:08
"Out the Blue" – 3:23
"Only People" – 3:23
"I Know (I Know)" – 3:49
"You Are Here" – 4:08
"Meat City" – 2:45

2002 reissue bonus tracks 
"Aisumasen (I'm Sorry)" (home version) – 3:35
"Bring on the Lucie (Freda Peeple)" (home version) – 1:02
"Meat City" (home version) – 2:36

Personnel 
Personnel per album sleeve and Bruce Spizer.

 John Lennon – lead, harmony and backing vocals, rhythm guitar, slide guitar, acoustic guitar, clavinet, percussion
 Ken Ascher – piano, Hammond organ, Mellotron
 David Spinozza – lead guitar
 Gordon Edwards – bass guitar
 Jim Keltner – drums
 Rick Marotta – drums on "Bring on the Lucie" and "Meat City" (with Keltner)
 Michael Brecker – saxophone
 Sneaky Pete Kleinow – pedal steel guitar
 Something Different – backing vocals
 Roy Cicala, Dan Barbiero – engineers
 Tom Rabstanek – mastering

Charts

Weekly charts

Year-end charts

Certifications

References 
 Footnotes

 Citations

External links

John Lennon albums
1973 albums
Apple Records albums
Albums arranged by John Lennon
Albums produced by John Lennon
Albums recorded at Record Plant (New York City)
EMI Records albums
Plastic Ono Band albums